The Core is a 2003 American science fiction disaster film directed by Jon Amiel and starring Aaron Eckhart, Hilary Swank, Delroy Lindo, Stanley Tucci, D. J. Qualls, Richard Jenkins, Tcheky Karyo, Bruce Greenwood, and Alfre Woodard. The film focuses on a team whose mission is to drill to the center of the Earth and set off a series of nuclear explosions in order to restart the rotation of the Earth's core. The film was released on March 28, 2003, by Paramount Pictures. It received mixed reviews from critics and grossed $74 million worldwide with a production budget of $85 million.

Plot
Several small, disparate incidents involving the Earth's magnetic field cause scientists led by geophysicist Dr. Josh Keyes and scientists Dr. Serge Leveque and Dr. Conrad Zimsky to conclude that the Earth's molten core has stopped rotating. Unless it can be restarted, the field will collapse within months, exposing the surface to devastating solar radiation. The U.S. government back a secret project to build a vessel that can drill to the core and release nuclear weapons to restart the rotation. They utilize the work of Dr. Ed "Braz" Brazzelton who has developed a material "Unobtainium" that can withstand and convert extreme heat into electricity, as well as a laser-based high-speed drilling array. NASA pilots Commander Robert Iverson and Major Rebecca "Beck" Childs are enlisted to pilot the multi-compartment vessel USS Virgil, while computer hacker Theodore Donald "Rat" Finch is brought on to keep news of the pending disaster or the attempt to restart the core from the Internet.

Virgil is launched through the Marianas Trench and successfully makes its way through the crust. The team accidentally drills through a gigantic empty geode structure, damaging the lasers when it lands at its base. As they traverse outside the ship to free the vessel from the crystalline structures, the geode starts to flood with magma, and Iverson is impaled by a falling shard and falls into the magma. The rest manage to return in time as Virgil continues its descent. Further down, they pass through a field of gigantic diamond formations, one of which breaches the last compartment housing the detonation timers for the nuclear charges. Leveque sacrifices himself to make sure that the others have the charges and launch codes before the compartment is crushed by the extreme pressure.

The team reaches the molten core and realizes it is much less dense than previously thought, throwing off their calculations on restarting its motions. They communicate with the surface, where Lieutenant General Thomas Purcell, overseeing the operation, orders them to abandon the effort and return immediately as they plan to use a secondary protocol to restart the core. Finch is secretly communicating with the Virgil team and learns that this secondary protocol is the top-secret project "DESTINI" (Deep Earth Seismic Trigger INItiative). Keyes finds that Zimsky was a lead scientist on "DESTINI," a tectonic weapon intended to be used by the U.S. but, when first tested, had caused the core's rotation to stop. Finch redirects power from DESTINI to prevent Purcell from activating it again, as Keyes fears that it could destroy the Earth instead of restarting the core. Meanwhile, destructive events, including a lightning storm in Rome and a burst of ultraviolet rays that destroys the Golden Gate Bridge, alert the world to the situation.

On Virgil, the remaining team comes up with a plan to place an explosive in each of the remaining compartments, release them, and time their detonations in an exact sequence to trigger the core's rotation through constructive wave interference. Due to the faulty design of Virgil because of time constraints, Brazzelton has to sacrifice himself to engage the compartment detachment mechanism in the vessel's underbelly. As they set the charges, Keyes and Zimsky realize that they need more explosive power than previously thought and in their race to adjust timings, Zimsky becomes trapped in a detached compartment. Keyes uses Virgils nuclear power source to provide the additional energy for the final detonation. While it leaves the main compartment powerless and Keyes and Childs trapped, the other explosions successfully restart the core's rotation. Keyes recalls that the unobtainium shell can convert the heat and pressure to energy, and the two of them wire the shell directly to their systems in time to power the craft and ride the pressure wave out of the core and up towards the surface through tectonic plates, eventually breaching into the floor of the ocean near Hawaii. Due to the much lower heat and pressure in this environment, Virgil no longer has sufficient power to establish communications. The government searches for them, and Finch, tracking nearby whale sound, realizes that the Virgil crew are using low-power ultrasound to draw whales nearby. Keyes and Childs are soon rescued.

In the aftermath, Finch uploads information about Virgil and its team and the classified information about "DESTINI" across the Internet, causing the world to revere the crew as heroes.

Cast
 Aaron Eckhart as Dr. Joshua "Josh" Keyes, a scientist and professor at the University of Chicago who designs the navigation system for Virgil and is assigned as head of the project.
 Hilary Swank as Major Rebecca "Beck" Childs, USAF, an astronaut who distinguished herself during an emergency crash landing of the Space Shuttle Endeavour in Los Angeles, California, a result of the magnetic instability.
 Delroy Lindo as Dr. Edward "Braz" Brazzelton, the designer of Virgil and the ultrasonic lasers. 
 Stanley Tucci as Dr. Conrad Zimsky, Earth specialist and designer of Project D.E.S.T.INI., based in Alaska. He went on high alert after the magnetic instability caused an attack in Trafalgar Square by an enormous flock of pigeons.
 Tcheky Karyo as Dr. Serge Leveque, nuclear weapons specialist.
 Bruce Greenwood as Commander Robert "Bob" Iverson, USN, Major Childs' commander and mentor.
 D. J. Qualls as Theodore Donald "Rat" Finch, a computer hacker who is widely regarded as the best in the world, crippled the FBI's database, recruited to control the flow of information on the Internet to prevent public panic.
 Alfre Woodard as Dr. Talma "Stick" Stickley, the mission controller for NASA Space Shuttle Endeavour and Virgil.
 Richard Jenkins as Lieutenant General Thomas Purcell, U.S. Army, leader of the operation.
 Fred Ewanvick as Endeavor Flight Engineer Jenkins

Production
The Core had out-to-sea scenes, starring , with full support of the US Navy.

The original plan for the shuttle landing scene had been for Endeavour to attempt a landing at Los Angeles International Airport with the shuttle coming to a halt on the nearby beaches. However, due to the events of September 11, 2001, the crew was not allowed to film at LAX. The scene was therefore rewritten with Endeavour landing in the LA river.

Reception
The Core garnered mixed reviews from critics. It has a 40% approval rating based on 157 reviews, with an average rating of 5.3/10, on the review aggregator website Rotten Tomatoes; the site's consensus states, "A B-movie with its tongue planted firmly in cheek, The Core is so unintentionally (intentionally?) bad that it's a hoot." On Metacritic, another aggregation website, the film has a weighted average score of 48 out of 100 based on reviews from 32 critics, indicating "mixed or average reviews". In his review, Roger Ebert gave the film two and a half stars out of four and said "I have such an unreasonable affection for this movie, indeed, that it is only by slapping myself alongside the head and drinking black coffee that I can restrain myself from recommending it."

The film grossed $31.1 million in United States theaters, and another $43.0 million overseas for a total worldwide gross of $74.1 million against a production budget of $85 million.

Several reviews cited the numerous scientific inaccuracies in the film. Elvis Mitchell of The New York Times said, "The brazen silliness of The Core is becalming and inauthentic, like taking a bath in nondairy coffee creamer. The Earth core's inability to turn is mirrored in the cast's inability to give the picture any spin." Kenneth Turan of the Los Angeles Times was a little more forgiving, saying, "If The Core finally has to be classified as a mess, it is an enjoyable one if you're in a throwback mood. After all, a film that comes up with a rare metal called unobtainium can't be dismissed out of hand."

In response to criticism of his screenplay's lack of scientific realism, screenwriter John Rogers responded that he tried to make the science accurate, but expended three years fighting "to get rid of the ... dinosaurs, magma-walks in 'space-suits', bullshit-sci-crap sources for the Earth's crisis, and a windshield for the ship Virgil."

On March 30, 2009, it was reported that Dustin Hoffman was leading a campaign to get more real science into science-fiction movies. Hoffman is on the advisory board of the Science & Entertainment Exchange, an initiative of the United States National Academy of Sciences, intended to foster collaborations between scientists and entertainment industry professionals in order to minimize inaccurate representations of science and technology such as those found in The Core.

In a poll of hundreds of scientists about bad science fiction films, The Core was voted the worst.

On February 21, 2010, The Guardian ran an article about American professor Sidney Perkowitz's proposals to curb bad science in science fiction movies. In the article, Perkowitz is said to have hated The Core. "If you violate [the coherent rules of science] you are in trouble. The chances are that the public will pick it up and that is what matters to Hollywood. The Core did not make money because people understood the science was so out to lunch," he added.

See also
 Crack in the World, 1965 film with a similar plot
 Deep Core, 2000 film with a similar plot
 Polar Storm, 2009 film with a similar plot
 List of disaster films

References

External links

 
 
 
 
 
  Review of The physics of The Core at Bad Astronomy
 Review of The Core at Intuitor.com

2003 films
2000s disaster films
2003 science fiction action films
2000s science fiction adventure films
American disaster films
American science fiction action films
American science fiction adventure films
Films about nuclear technology
Films about scientists
Films about the United States Navy
Films directed by Jon Amiel
Films scored by Christopher Young
Films set in Alaska
Films set in Boston
Films set in California
Films set in Chicago
Films set in London
Films set in Los Angeles
Films set in Paris
Films set in Rome
Films set in San Francisco
Films set in the Middle East
Films set in the Pacific Ocean
Films set in the San Francisco Bay Area
Films set in Utah
Films set in Washington, D.C.
Films shot in Vancouver
Films with screenplays by John Rogers
Paramount Pictures films
Travel to the Earth's center
Films set in subterranea
2000s English-language films
2000s American films